Serdis is a genus of skipper butterflies in the family Hesperiidae.

One representative is Serdis fractifascia found in the tropical forests of Colombia.

References
Natural History Museum Lepidoptera genus database

Hesperiini
Hesperiidae genera